The World War I Monument is an outdoor memorial commemorating veterans of World War I (including nearly 200,000 Texans), installed on the Texas State Capitol grounds in Austin, Texas, United States. The Texas Sunset Red Granite monument was erected by members of the Department of Texas, Veterans of Foreign Wars in 1961. The artist, whose name is engraved at the base of the monument, is Joe Machac. It lists the barracks and auxiliaries that worked to create the memorial.

See also
 1961 in art

References

1961 establishments in Texas
1961 sculptures
Granite sculptures in Texas
Monuments and memorials in Texas
Outdoor sculptures in Austin, Texas
World War I memorials in the United States